Charles H. Davis (Fairfield, Illinois – circa November 1976) was a Republican lawyer who has twice served on the Illinois Supreme Court, once as Chief Justice, and on the Illinois Appellate Court, also as Presiding Justice.

Davis grew up and attended school in Fairfield.  He graduated from the University of Illinois (A.B., 1928) and the University of Chicago (J.D., 1931) and became a lawyer in Rockford in 1931.  He married Ruth Peugh on October 19, 1935 and had seven children.

He was elected to the Illinois Supreme Court from the 6th District in 1955, serving until 1960, and was its Chief Justice from 1957 to 1958.  He was elected to the 2nd District of the Illinois Appellate Court in November 1964 and was its Presiding Justice in 1967 and in 1970.  From the 2nd District, he was elected a second time to the Supreme Court in November 1970; he retired from the court in October 1975.

He was in the Phi Delta Phi legal fraternity and was a Congregationalist and Shriner.

He was still alive , but there is a record of "Memorial Services Held in the Supreme Court of Illinois at the November Term, 1976, on the Life, Character and Public Service of Charles H. Davis" in volume 64 of the 2nd series of the Illinois Reports.

References

1906 births
1976 deaths
American Congregationalists
Chief Justices of the Illinois Supreme Court
Judges of the Illinois Appellate Court
Illinois lawyers
Illinois Republicans
Politicians from Rockford, Illinois
People from Wayne County, Illinois
University of Chicago Law School alumni
University of Illinois Urbana-Champaign alumni
20th-century American lawyers
20th-century American judges
Justices of the Illinois Supreme Court